Lucian Kahn is an American musician and role-playing game writer/designer based in Brooklyn. His work focuses on LGBT, Jewish, and subcultural themes, typically utilizing satire and farce.

Music 

Kahn was the singer, songwriter and electric guitar player for the Brooklyn queercore punk band Schmekel, which explored his identity as a gay, Jewish, trans man through comedy. According to the Jewish Music Research Centre, Kahn wrote the lyrics and punk chord progressions on the guitar for songs like "I'm Sorry, It's Yom Kippur," then electronic keyboard player Ricky Riot altered the chord progressions to make them sound cantorial. Eddy Portnoy wrote that Schmekel was an unsurprising development in Jewish culture because there was evidence of transgender people in the shtetls of early 20th century Europe.
Kahn has said that his medical transition from female to male improved his connection to music because of gaining a masculine singing voice. In describing his performances with Schmekel, Kahn said, "Comedy is sacred to me, which is a pretty Jewish sentiment, isn’t it?" When Original Plumbing magazine asked Kahn if he would ever write serious songs, he gave the answer, "All of my seriousness is in my humor." Kahn appears as the lead singer of Schmekel in the Tales of the City novel The Days of Anna Madrigal by Armistead Maupin, being flirted with by the character Amos.

Game Writing and Design 

Kahn made the tabletop role-playing games Dead Friend: A Game of Necromancy, Visigoths vs. Mall Goths, and the boxed trilogy If I Were a Lich, Man. All three games started out self-published as indie role-playing games, then were reprinted by Hit Point Press in 2023 after the Canadian publisher's kickstarter campaign for If I Were a Lich, Man raised $84,590 in two weeks. The first draft of If I Were a Lich, Man won the Indie Game Developer Network award for "Most Innovative" in 2020. Visigoths vs. Mall Goths was nominated for the ENNIE Awards for "Best Writing" in 2020 and was part of the exhibition "Game Play: Between Fantasy and Realism" at the Museum of the Moving Image. The art for Visigoths vs. Mall Goths is by Los Angeles artist Robin Eisenberg. Visigoths vs. Mall Goths lets players play LGBTQ people in 1990s goth subculture with a focus on bisexual people, and uses both classic RPG and dating sim game mechanics. Dead Friend is in the form of a ritual. Both Dead Friend and If I Were a Lich, Man were influenced by the Passover Seder.

Kahn also contributed to projects with other game designers. He co-edited the LARP anthology Honey & Hot Wax, which was nominated for an IndieCade award in 2020. Kahn wrote the setting "Gaylords" for the Thirsty Sword Lesbians expansion Advanced Lovers & Lesbians. He wrote the scenario "Oy VAYmpires: A Shanda fur di Jiangshi" for Banana Chan's Jiangshi: Blood in the Banquet Hall.

Kahn lists his favorite game mechanics as "Rituals and ceremonies, open-ended story prompts, physical objects that affect both control flow and atmosphere, real-time character development, spontaneous creation of art, poetry, and music." He often starts new game projects with a funny title then writes a draft and playtests iteratively.

Political Views 

Kahn came out in support of the Kickstarter United unit of the OPEIU Local 153 tech union during his crowdfunding campaign for Visigoths vs. Mall Goths, mentioning past work with the Kaplan Teachers Union.

In LGBT and Gender Studies 

Dr. Judith Kegan Gardiner at the University of Illinois at Chicago cited Lucian Kahn's statements on Schmekel's website as an example that trans men "report their masculine identities as fundamental," quoting: "he claimed his sex was male, his gender was 'a guy,' and his 'weirdness' was '100% my own personality' though 'the type of guy I am—you know, genderwise—is not special'."

Dr. Avery Brooks Tompkins at Transylvania University in Kentucky criticized Kahn for negatively characterizing cisgender people who are "interested in trans people's transness, specifically," arguing that accepting the erotic appeal of transness is needed for sex-positive trans politics.

References 

Transgender Jews
21st-century American Jews
21st-century LGBT people
Transgender musicians
American LGBT musicians
American game designers
Board game designers